The Wyoming State Fair is a largely agricultural exposition and rodeo held every August in Douglas in Converse County in southeastern Wyoming. The fairgrounds are located on west Yellowstone Highway on the waterside of North Platte River. The state fair began in 1886 as the “First Annual Wyoming Territorial Fair near Cheyenne. After events in Laramie, Sheridan and Casper Douglas won the nomination in 1905 to host the fair thereafter. There were no fair events in 1935 to 1937 during the Depression and none in 1942 to 1945 because of World War II

The 2012 State Fair, the centennial of the event, was held from August 11-18th, with singer Dierks Bentley headlining the first ever sold-out concert at the fair in Douglas.

The 101st fair opened on August 10, 2013. It hosted the country musicians Hunter Hayes and Brantley Gilbert.

Despite the COVID-19 pandemic in 2020, the fair resisted cancellation. Since that year, masks are required and all attendees must adhere to social distancing guidelines.

The state fair is officially sanctioned by the Wyoming Department of Agriculture.

During the fair, a maximum of 455 camping places are available on the south side of the fairgrounds; parking space is limited.

See also 
 Wyoming Pioneer Association

References

External links 

Wyoming State Fair: Official Website

State fairs
Douglas, Wyoming
Tourist attractions in Converse County, Wyoming
Festivals in Wyoming
Festivals established in 1886